The switching Kalman filtering (SKF) method is a variant of the Kalman filter. In its generalised form, it is often attributed to Kevin P. Murphy, but related switching state-space models have been in use.

Applications

Applications of the switching Kalman filter include: Brain–computer interfaces and neural decoding, real-time decoding for continuous neural-prosthetic control, and sensorimotor learning in humans.
It also has application in econometrics, signal processing, tracking, computer vision, etc. It is an alternative to the Kalman filter when the system's state has a discrete component. The additional error when using a Kalman filter instead of a Switching Kalman filter may be quantified in terms of the switching system's parameters. For example, when an industrial plant has "multiple discrete modes of behaviour, each of which having a linear (Gaussian) dynamics".

Model
There are several variants of SKF discussed in.

Special case
In the simpler case, switching state-space models are defined based on a switching variable which evolves independent of the hidden variable. The probabilistic model of such variant of SKF is as the following:

[This section is badly written: It does not explain the notation used below.]

 

The hidden variables include not only the continuous , but also a discrete *switch* (or switching) variable . The dynamics of the switch variable are defined by the term .

The switch variable can take its values from a set .

General case
The filtering and smoothing procedure for general cases is discussed in.

References

Control theory
Nonlinear filters
Linear filters
Signal estimation
Stochastic differential equations
Robot control
Markov models